Hasselhøj is a residential area built in 1984, located in peaceful surroundings in Hasselager south of Aarhus, Denmark. Its postal code is 8361.

Neighbourhoods in Denmark